Chunchula is an unincorporated community and census-designated place (CDP) in Mobile County, Alabama, United States. As of the 2020 census, its population was 195. It has a post office with the 36521 ZIP code. The community has one site listed on the Alabama Register of Landmarks and Heritage, the Chunchula School.

Demographics

Chunchula was listed on the 1880 and 1890 U.S. Censuses as a village. It did not reappear on the U.S. Census until 2010 as a census-designated place or CDP.

Geography
U.S. Route 45 passes through the community, leading south  to Mobile and north  to Citronelle.

Education
Residents are zoned to Mobile County Public School System campuses. Residents are zoned to McDavid-Jones Elementary School (K-5), Lott Middle School (6-8), and Citronelle High School (9-12).

References

Unincorporated communities in Alabama
Census-designated places in Mobile County, Alabama
Census-designated places in Alabama